The 1975 DFB-Pokal Final decided the winner of the 1974–75 DFB-Pokal, the 32nd season of Germany's knockout football cup competition. It was played on 21 June 1975 at the Niedersachsenstadion in Hanover. Eintracht Frankfurt won the match 1–0 against MSV Duisburg, to claim their 2nd cup title.

Route to the final
The DFB-Pokal began with 128 teams in a single-elimination knockout cup competition. There were a total of six rounds leading up to the final. Teams were drawn against each other, and the winner after 90 minutes would advance. If still tied, 30 minutes of extra time was played. If the score was still level, a replay would take place at the original away team's stadium. If still level after 90 minutes, 30 minutes of extra time was played. If the score was still level, a penalty shoot-out was used to determine the winner.

Note: In all results below, the score of the finalist is given first (H: home; A: away).

Match

Details

References

External links
 Match report at kicker.de 
 Match report at WorldFootball.net
 Match report at Fussballdaten.de 

Eintracht Frankfurt matches
MSV Duisburg matches
1974–75 in German football cups
1975
Sports competitions in Hanover
20th century in Hanover
June 1975 sports events in Europe